Thelephora terrestris is an inedible species of fungus in the Basidiomycota phylum. It is commonly known by the name Common Fiber Vase because of its circular and overlapping cap. As well, it has also been called the Earthfan fungus.

History and taxonomy
This fungus was first described by Jakob Friedrich Ehrhart in 1787.

Habitat and ecology
Throughout North America and Europe Thelephora terrestris can be found in soil. It is commonly found in sandy soils under pine trees, on roots and twigs.

This ectomycorrhizal fungus forms a symbiotic relationship known as mycorrhizae, especially with Pinus species. It is commonly found in pine forests as well as plant nursery soils world wide. This fungi is known to get water and nutrients from far away and being capable of growing in both low fertility and high fertility soils.
 
It is a dominant mycorrhizal fungus, re-establishes quickly after disturbances such as forest fire, and is considered stress tolerant.

Outside of the Pinus genus, it is also capable of forming mycorrizha with other trees such as alder, birch, oak, beech, and poplar.

Thelephora terrestris virus 1 (TtV1), which is a mycovirus, can infect this fungi.

Description
Thelephora terrestris is present year round, though is mostly seen July to December. As the fruiting body forms, it starts off lighter in colour then turns to a darker shade of brown as it ages. A stalk may not be present, if there is one, it is usually very short. Sometimes the fungi is grown in large colonies. The shape is described as a fan and can grow up to 6 cm wide. It has been described to have a moldy earth like smell.

The hyphae of mycorrhizal forms walls  that becomes thicker as it ages, while in earlier stages may be spiney. When mating, the hyphae forms clamp connections The spores are purple-brown colour, ellipsoid or angular shape.

The edibility of fungus is unknown, but it is considered too tough to be worthwhile.

Thelephora palmata is a similar species which is comparatively stinky and less widely distributed.

Physiology

The full life cycle can be reproduced and studied in a laboratory, both ectomycorrhizal form and mushroom form.

Due to the mycotoxins that the fungi produces, it protects pinus trees from root pathogen Phytophthora cinnamomi.

References

Terrestris
Taxa named by Jakob Friedrich Ehrhart